The 1997 Irish Masters was the twenty-third edition of the professional non-ranking snooker tournament that took place between 6–13 March 1997 at the Goffs in Kill, County Kildare, Republic of Ireland.

Stephen Hendry defeated Darren Morgan 9–8 in the final by winning the last two frame at 7–8 down.

Main draw

Century breaks
 
129  John Parrott
127  Stephen Hendry
121, 118, 101  Ronnie O'Sullivan
100, 100  Darren Morgan

References 

1997
Irish Masters
Masters
Irish Masters